For the Love of Money is a 2012 action crime drama film directed by Ellie Kanner-Zuckerman, featuring Yehuda Levi, Edward Furlong, James Caan, Jeffrey Tambor, and Jonathan Lipnicki.

Plot
In Tel Aviv, 1973, young Izek is raised in a seedy, gangster-filled illegal casino that operates behind his family's bar. When violence and crime finds its way to him and his family, Izek and his family relocate to Los Angeles. Hoping to start anew, Izek pursues his ambitions, and becomes successful. He falls in love  with the beautiful Aline.
However, the world of crime Izek tried to escape continues to dog him. Threatened by a temperamental gangster (James Caan), his criminal cousin (Oded Fehr), and a Colombian drug lord (Steven Bauer), Izek struggles for a clean slate as those close to him fall victim to the promises of quick money through crime.

Cast
Yehuda Levi as Yuda Levi 
 Delphine Chanéac as Aline
 James Caan as Mickey
 Joshua Biton as Yoni
 Cody Longo as Young Izek
 Jeffrey Tambor as Mr. Solomon
 Richard Gunn as Vince
 Edward Furlong as Tommy
 Oded Fehr as Levi
 Paul Sorvino as Priest
 Steven Bauer as Colombian drug lord
 Jonathan Lipnicki as Young Yoni
 Michael Benyaer
 Hal Ozsan
 Meredith Scott Lynn
 Inbar Lavi
 Leilani Sarelle
 Robb Skyler

Production
The film is based on the life of one of the executive producers.

Release
Archstone Distribution gave the film a limited release in the U.S. on June 8, 2012.

Soundtrack

 Ramble Tamble -	Creedence Clearwater Revival
Joy To The World -	Three Dog Night
Spirit In The Sky -	Norman Greenbaum
20th Century Boy -	T. Rex
Mr. Desperation -	Lovechild Suicide
Black Bikini Island - Curtis Marolt
Magic Carpet Ride - Steppenwolf
Boo's Boogie Woogie - Boo Boo Bradley
Call Me - Blondie
Lonely Is The Night - Billy Squier
Daydream Believer - Stingray Music
You Dropped a Bomb on Me - The Minderettes
The Stroke - Billy Squier
Desert Queen - Chasing June
Saved by Zero - The Fixx
Sick Of Me - Trevor Keith
I Ran (So Far Away) - A Flock of Seagulls
Chutzpa - Steve Glotzer
Argentia - Victor Orlando
In The Air Tonight - Phil Collins
Cult of Personality - Living Colour
For The Love Of Money - The Hit Co.

Reception
The film received 0% positive reviews on the film-critic aggregator  Rotten Tomatoes. Gary Goldstein in the Los Angeles Times said the film "opens with pep, swagger and the promise of a crackling journey. But, as this mini-saga unfolds, it decelerates into an unremarkable good-guys-vs.-bad-guys tale that ends in a glaringly tension-free showdown."

References

External links
 

2012 films
2012 crime drama films
American crime drama films
Films directed by Ellie Kanner
2010s English-language films
2010s American films